Fred Lowenthal (November 22, 1878 – October 4, 1931) was an American football player, coach, sportswriter, and attorney. He served as head football coach at the University of Illinois at Urbana–Champaign in 1904, along with Arthur R. Hall, Justa Lindgren, and Clyde Matthews, and alone in 1905, compiling a record of 14–6–1. Lowenthal played football at Illinois as a center from 1898 to 1901.

Head coaching record

References

1878 births
1931 deaths
19th-century players of American football
American football centers
Illinois Fighting Illini football coaches
Illinois Fighting Illini football players
Sportspeople from Chicago
Players of American football from Chicago